The Alcaligenaceae are a family of bacteria, included in the order Burkholderiales. Members are found in water, soil, humans, and other animals. Some species, like Bordetella, are pathogenic for humans and for some other animals.

References

Burkholderiales